XHSCBZ-FM is a community radio station on 103.5 FM in Santiago de Anaya, Hidalgo. The station is owned by the civil association XIMAI Comunicaciones, A.C.

History
After some broadcasts as a pirate in 2016 and 2017, XIMAI Comunicaciones filed for a community station on October 13, 2017. The concession was approved on November 5, 2018. Test transmissions for XHSCBZ-FM began on June 1, 2019.

References

Radio stations in Hidalgo (state)
Community radio stations in Mexico
Radio stations established in 2019